Albert Edward Curly Denyer (9 April 1893 – 1969) was an English professional footballer who made over 320 appearances in the Football League for Swindon Town as a forward.

Personal life 
Denyer's brother Frank and son Bertie were also footballers. Denyer served as a sergeant in the Royal Fusiliers (City of London Regiment) during the First World War and was severely wounded, losing half of his intestines. After his retirement from football he became landlord of the Running Horse pub in Swindon.

Career statistics

Honours 
Heart of Midlothian

 Rosebery Charity Cup: 1916–17

References

Footballers from Plaistow, Newham
English footballers
Ilford F.C. players
Leyton F.C. players
West Ham United F.C. players
Swindon Town F.C. players
Heart of Midlothian F.C. wartime guest players
English Football League players
1893 births
1969 deaths
Association football outside forwards
Brentford F.C. wartime guest players
Isthmian League players
Southern Football League players
England youth international footballers
British Army personnel of World War I
Royal Fusiliers soldiers
Military personnel from Essex